A summit-level canal is an artificial waterway connecting two separate river valleys. The term refers to a canal that rises to cross a summit then falls down the other side. The summit pound is a level stretch of water at the highest part of the canal, contained by two locks that prevent the water from flowing downstream in both directions. Since water flows out when locks open to admit boats, the summit pound must have a water supply.

By contrast, a lateral canal has a continuous fall only.  Summit-level canals were an essential step in developing transport systems connecting different parts of a country before the railways or modern road transport.

History
The first canal to connect rivers across a watershed was the Lingqu Canal ("Magic Canal") in China which connected the Xiang and Li rivers in 219 BCE for military transport; however this is not usually considered a summit level canal as the summit level was a flat cut and there were originally no locks, though lateral canals with locks were added later on the two rivers.

The honour for the first summit-level canal therefore goes to the Grand Canal of China. This was started in the 4th century BCE with major extensions in 329 CE, and  used single locks until the 10th century when pound locks were introduced. But it was the rerouting of the canal in the 1280s to shorten the connection to the new capital Beijing at the start of the Yuan dynasty, crossing the Yangtze and Yellow Rivers, that established it as a summit-level canal.

In Europe, the first summit-level canal was the Stecknitz Canal (1390–1398) in Germany which connected the Stecknitz river to the Delvenau, a tributary of the Elbe, as part of the Old Salt Route. It used fifteen staunches and had a  summit level; the millers only opened the flash locks on alternate days.

The first summit canal to use pound locks was the Briare Canal in France which was completed in 1642. This  canal connected the Loire valley to that of the Seine to carry the agricultural produce of the Loire to Paris. In many ways it is the ancestor of all modern summit-level canals being fed from its reservoir, Étang de la Gazonne.

But the greatest engineering feat of the 17th century was the Canal du Midi in Southern France opened in 1684, joining the Garonne, which drains into the Atlantic Ocean to the Étang de Thau which leads to the Mediterranean. Its  length rises  at the western end and falls  to the east via 103 locks, one tunnel and three major aqueducts.

The industrial revolution brought about a huge network of canals in England and other European countries which made summit levels a commonplace.

List of major summit-level canals by continent

Asia
China
Grand Canal
Lingqu Canal

Europe
France
Canal de Briare
Canal du Midi
Canal du Rhône au Rhin
Canal du Centre
Canal de l'Oise à l'Aisne

Germany
Rhine-Main-Danube Canal
Kiel Canal

England
Trent and Mersey Canal
Leeds and Liverpool Canal
Grand Union Canal
Kennet and Avon Canal
Rochdale Canal
Huddersfield Narrow Canal
Oxford Canal

Northern Ireland
Newry Canal

Scotland
Caledonian Canal
Crinan Canal
Forth and Clyde Canal

Poland
Augustów Canal

Russia
White Sea – Baltic Canal
Volga–Baltic Waterway

Sweden
Göta Canal

North America
United States
Chesapeake and Delaware Canal
Erie Canal
Morris Canal

Canada
Rideau Canal

Panama
Panama Canal

See also
Contour canal

References

Canals
Water transport infrastructure